Aimée de Coigny (12 October 1769 – 17 January 1820) was a French noblewoman who was known as a great beauty and was imprisoned during the French Revolution.
André Chénier's elegy la Jeune Captive, published in 1795, was inspired by her ordeal.

Early years

Aimée de Coigny was the daughter of Auguste-Gabriel de Franquetot, comte de Coigny.
He was born in 1740, joined the army, became colonel of dragoons in 1763, maréchal-de-camp in 1780, and on 1 January 1811 gained the rank of lieutenant general.
Her father married Anne Josèphe Michel de Roissy on 18 March 1767.
Anne-Françoise-Aimée de Coigny was born on 12 October 1769 and baptised in the church of Saint-Roch.
Her mother died on 23 October 1775, and her father confided her upbringing to his mistress, Victoire de Rohan, Princess of Guéménée.

Aimée became a famous beauty.
Madame de Genlis, an intimate friend, wrote of her in her memoirs:
I saw again with great pleasure; at Isle-Adam, the young Comtesse de Coigny, formerly Mademoiselle de Roissy, with whom I had been close at the Couvent du Précieux-Sang. She had originality, wit and good feelings; we renewed our acquaintance; she told me that she had a passion for anatomy, a very extraordinary taste in a young woman of eighteen. Since I had been somewhat occupied with surgery and medicine, and knew how to bleed, Madame de Coigny was very fond of chatting with me. I promised to do an anatomy class, but not like her, on corpses ..."

Aimée married André-Hercule-Marie-Louis de Rosset de Rocozel (1770–1810), marquis and later duc de Fleury in 1784. 
Her husband was the grand-nephew of Cardinal André-Hercule de Fleury.
She married very young, as was common at the time; she was 15, he was 14.
He became a duke in 1788. He was subject to nervous tics that were very disagreeable, and the marriage was not happy.
Aimee became the mistress of Armand Louis de Gontaut, duc de Lauzun (1747–1793), a well-known libertine, if past his prime.
During a visit to Rome, she became attached to Lord Malmesbury.

French revolution

Aimée's husband Fleury emigrated during the French Revolution (1789–99), leaving France in 1791.
He joined Louis Joseph, Prince of Condé's army at Koblenz.
Aimée went to London, where she rejoined Malmesbury.
She gave birth to Malmesbury's child in London.
In January 1793 she left London for Paris with Lord Malmesbury.
He was soon arrested, but was released almost immediately and returned to London, leaving his mistress.
She retired to her personal estate at Mareuil-en-Brie, near Paris.
On 7 May 1793 she obtained a divorce.
She then resumed the name of Coigny.

On 4 March 1794, despite the care she had taken to dissociate herself from any emigrants, she was arrested and taken to the Prison Saint-Lazare.
Aimée was one of the last of the nobility to be arrested and incarcerated.
André Chénier was inspired by her to compose a well-known elegy, la Jeune Captive, published in 1895.
He described her graceful figure and her easy and careless character.

Casimir de Mouret, comte de Montrond, was also imprisoned in 1794 in the Prison Saint-Lazare, where he met her. 
He obtained her freedom and his own for a payment of 100 louis.
She was released on the day she was due to follow Chénier to the scaffold.
They married after the Thermidorian Reaction of 27 July 1794 and left for England.
Their married life in London was not successful.

First Empire

The marriage went from bad to worse from 1800 onward. The divorce due to incompatibility was pronounced on 6 Germinal year X (28 March 1802).
Aimée again became known as Madame Aimée de Coigny.
At the age of 31, Aimée de Coigny, once more free, fell in love with the 37-year-old Jacques Joseph Garat (known as Maillia-Garat).
He was a member of the Tribunát and was known as an orator, but was not known as a republican.
They lived together for six years.

In a sympathetic sketch, Victor du Bled says Aimée's second divorce gave her a freedom that she used or misused considerably.
She had an ardent and eccentric imagination that exposed her to a thousand dangers to which she hastened to succumb.
When someone remarked that divorce makes adultery useless, she said, "We cannot marry them all, though."
Élisabeth Vigée Le Brun said that Aimée had an enchanting face, a burning gaze, and the figure of a Venus.
One evening at the house of M. de Guéménée, she removed the long tail of her dress in front of fifty people.
The princess, laughing, invited her to remove the dress too, and she rose to the challenge and remained for four hours dressed in a short petticoat.
Napoleon disliked her loose morals and at reception at the Tuileries Palace asked her in public, "Well, Madame, are you still so fond of men?" 
Her riposte was, "Yes, Sire, when they are polite."

Around 1812 the 43-year-old Aimée de Coigny formed a liaison with the 45-year-old marquis Bruno-Gabriel de Boisgelin, and under his influence became an ardent royalist.
She believed that the monarchy must be restored, but it should be a progressive monarchy that would reconcile freedom and order.
In the summer of 1812, she often visited Talleyrand's house, where she would find him in his library surrounded by writers or lovers of literature.
She became a regular visitor to the houses of people who were dissatisfied with Napoleon's rule.
During the last days of the Empire in 1814, Aimee wrote to her uncle, the duc de Coigny, in London and told her of the conditions for Talleyrand to give his support to the king.
The king instructed the duc to accept the offer.
Not long after, the Russian army entered Paris.

Death

Aimée de Coigny died on 17 January 1820 at the age of 50.
Madame de Genlis observed that the comtesse de Coigny died very young, and it was said that her passion for anatomy contributed to her death by making her breathe bad air, since she never travelled without having a cadaver in the back of her carriage.
She had confided her memoirs to Talleyrand, Montrond's friend, and it was long thought that they had been lost.
They were later found and published as Mémoires de Aimée de Coigny (1902) with a lengthy introduction by Étienne Lamy.

Publications
Publications by Aimée de Coigny included:

Notes

References

Sources

1769 births
1820 deaths
French countesses
French duchesses
19th-century French women writers
19th-century French memoirists